Grant Conard (August 5, 1867 – November 5, 1919) was an American Republican politician  from California.

Grant Conard was born on August 5, 1867 in La Salle County, Illinois. He was a real estate developer. He was mayor of San Diego during 1909–1911, and from 1915 to 1917 he served in the California State Assembly for the 79th district.

Conard died November 5, 1919, in San Diego, aged 52.

References

Mayors of San Diego
1867 births
1919 deaths
19th-century American politicians
20th-century American politicians
American real estate businesspeople
Republican Party members of the California State Assembly
19th-century American businesspeople